Ayşe Safinaz Nurefsun Kadın ("womanly", "the pure one" and "light charm";  1850 –  1915), called also Nurefzun Kadın, was the second consort of Sultan Abdul Hamid II of the Ottoman Empire.

Early life
Safinaz Nurefsun Kadın was born in 1850. Her real name was Ayşe Hanım. Her father was Şermet Selim Bey, who died while fighting the Russians. She had a elder sister, Yıldız Hanim, last consort of Ottoman Sultan Abdülmejid I. She had been a servant in the household of Isma'il Pasha, the khedive of Egypt, who presented her to Sultan Abdulaziz. She had blonde hair, fair skin, and blue eyes, and was described a beautiful woman. She was fond of playing violin.

Marriages
Safinaz Nurefsun married Abdul Hamid as his second consort when he was a prince. 

When her sister Yıldız Hanım married Abdülmejid I, Ayşe was sent to the household of Şehzade Abdülaziz (the future Sultan Abdülaziz), where she take name Safinaz. According to Harun Açba, Abdülaziz was fascinated by her beauty and wanted to marry her but she declined because she was in love with Şehzade Abdülhamid (the future Sultan Abdülhamid II). The feeling was mutual and the young prince asked his adoptive mother Rahime Perestu Kadın’s help. She told Abdülaziz that Safinaz was ill and that she needed a change of air; later, Abdülaziz was informed that she had passed away. Abdülhamid therefore married in secret Safinaz, now renamed Nurefsun, in October 1868.

She did not have any children. After Abdul Hamid's accession to the throne in 1876, she was given the title of "Second Consort". In 1877, Nurefsun and other members of the imperial family settled in the Yıldız Palace, after Abdul Hamid moved there on 7 April 1877.

However, Nurefsun could not get used to life in the harem, though, and wanted to be Abdülhamid’s only wife. She therefore asked for a divorce. Abdul Hamid fulfilled her request, and she was granted a divorce in 1879. She afterwards married İkinci Esvapçı Saffet Bey, with whom she had a son, who towards the end of Abdul Hamid's reign became a secretary (mabeyn katibi) in the palace.

Death
Ayşe Safinaz Nurefsun Kadın died in 1915.

See also
Kadın (title)
Ottoman Imperial Harem
List of consorts of the Ottoman sultans

References

Sources

1851 births
1915 deaths
19th-century consorts of Ottoman sultans
Abdul Hamid II